Thecacoris trichogyne, synonym Thecacoris annobonae, is a species of plant in the family Phyllanthaceae. It is found in west-central and south tropical Africa (Angola, Cameroon, the Democratic Republic of the Congo, the Republic of the Congo, Gabon, the Gulf of Guinea Islands and Zambia). It is a shrub or tree and grows primarily in wet tropical habitats.

Conservation
Thecacoris annobonae was assessed as "endangered" in the 2004 IUCN Red List, where it is said to be native only to Annobón and Cameroon. , this species regarded as a synonym of Thecacoris trichogyne, which has a wider distribution.

References

Phyllanthaceae
Endangered plants
Flora of Angola
Flora of Cameroon
Flora of the Democratic Republic of the Congo
Flora of the Republic of the Congo
Flora of Gabon
Flora of Zambia
Taxonomy articles created by Polbot